Afioga Tuimalealiʻifano Vaʻaletoʻa Eti Sualauvi II (born 29 April 1947) is a Samoan politician who is the current O le Ao o le Malo (head of state) of Samoa, in office since 2017. He was appointed to the Tama-a-ʻaiga title of Tuimalealiʻifano in July 1977, one of four paramount titles of Samoa.

Biography 

Tuimalealiʻifano Vaʻaletoʻa Eti Sualauvi II is a member of the Tuimalealiʻifano family, a cadet branch of the Sā Tupua state dynasty and one of the four paramount titles of Samoa. He is married to Masiofo Faʻamausili Leinafo Tuimalealiʻifano.

He is the great-grandson of one of the Mau movement leaders, Tuimaleali'ifano Fa'aoloi'i Si'ua'ana I, and grand-nephew of the sole Member of the Council of Deputies (1962–1974), Tui Aʻana Tuiaana Tuimaleali'ifano Suatipatipa II.

Early career 

He worked as a policeman, lawyer and previously was a Samoan Police Chief Inspector and a secondary school teacher. He was a police officer in New Zealand for three years. He also served as a public-defender, public trustee, and barrister and solicitor in the Supreme Court of Samoa. He is an elder deacon and lay preacher for the Congregational Christian Church of Samoa in the village of Matautu Falelatai. He has preached sermons in Australia and New Zealand for the Christian Congregational Church of Samoa.

2001 general election 

During the 2001 general election, Tuimalealiʻifano ran for the legislative assembly contesting the constituency of Falelatai and Samatau as an independent candidate. His opponent was the incumbent representative Misa Telefoni Retzlaff of the Human Rights Protection Party. As a Tama-a-Aiga (lit. sons of the families) and holder of one of the four paramount Matai titles in Samoa, Tuimalealiʻifano filed his candidacy to restore prominence to his family title, which, according to him, went unrecognised in the public arena. He also pointed out that current and past holders of the other three paramount Tama-a-Aiga had various monuments honouring them, which was not the case for his title. Once Tuimalealiʻifano launched his candidacy, he sought the endorsement of the Falelatai village council; however, they instead backed Misa. The reason why they refused to support Tuimalealiʻifano was that they could not bare to see a Tama-a-Aiga be involved in a political conflict where they would face ridicule, damaging the title. The council also mentioned that should Tuimalealiʻifano be victorious, his role in parliament as an independent would most likely be minor. They instead attempted to convince Tuimalealiʻifano to remain a member of the council of deputies and explained to him that he was likely to become the next head of state. Tuimalealiʻifano refused to withdraw, to which the council responded, "then do as you please". He then continued to argue against the council's decision and brought up delicate issues which inflamed tensions between himself and the council. Tuimalealiʻifano was ultimately defeated in a landslide by Misa, earning 38% of the vote to his opponent's 61%.

Tuimalealiʻifano's parliamentary bid left him in over WS$200,000 in debt. Increased tensions during the campaign led the village council to banish Tuimalealiʻifano from Falelatai several weeks after the election. Some individuals who voted for Tuimalealiʻifano were also banished.

Statesman 

He was a member of the Council of Deputies to the Head of State from 1993 to 2001 and since 2004. He was sworn in as O le Ao o le Malo on  21 July 2017. In 2019, he hosted the visit of President Russell M. Nelson of the Church of Jesus Christ of Latter-day Saints.

2021 Constitutional crisis

In May 2021, Sualauvi purported to revoke the results of the 2021 election and call new elections. The decision was overturned by the Samoa Supreme Court on 17 May 2021. Sualauvi then issued a proclamation to prevent the Legislative Assembly of Samoa from meeting, triggering a constitutional crisis.

In July 2022 his term of office was extended until the next parliamentary sitting in August. On 23 August 2022 he was reappointed as head of state for a further five-year term.

Chancellor of USP 

On 1 July 2022, Tuimalealiʻifano's term as the 29th chancellor of the University of the South Pacific commenced, succeeding Niue's Dalton Tagelagi. Tuimalealiʻifano's term is expected to conclude on 30 July 2023.

Education

Sualauvi has a Bachelor of Laws (LLB) degree from the Australian National University and a Certificate and Diploma in Theological Studies from Malua Theological College.

Notes

References

External links
Vaʻaletoʻa Sualauvi II: Official site

|-

|-

|-

1947 births
Australian National University alumni
Living people
Members of the Council of Deputies
O le Ao o le Malo of Samoa
Samoan police officers
Samoan chiefs
Samoan Christian clergy
Samoan lawyers
Samoan Congregationalists
21st-century Samoan politicians